Lower Mittagong is a scattered village in the Southern Highlands of New South Wales, Australia, in Wingecarribee Shire. It is located east of Mittagong and south of Aylmerton. Lower Mittagong was previously known as Chalkers Flat and Nattai.

Towns of the Southern Highlands (New South Wales)
Wingecarribee Shire